Sphaerolobium pubescens is a species of flowering plant in the family Fabaceae and is endemic to the south of Western Australia. It is a small shrub or subshrub with slender stems, tapering linear leaves and dense racemes of yellow flowers.

Description

Taxonomy
Sphaerolobium pubescens was first formally described in 1998 by Ryonen Butcher in the journal Nuytsia from specimens collected near Narrikup in 1996. The specific epithet (pubescens) means "downy, with soft, fine hairs".

Distribution and habitat
This species of pea grows in winter-wet areas and undulating plains in near coastal areas of the Esperance Plains, Jarrah Forest and Warren bioregions of southern Western Australia.

Conservation status
Sphaerolobium pubescens is listed as "not threatened" by the Government of Western Australia Department of Biodiversity, Conservation and Attractions.

References

pubescens
Eudicots of Western Australia
Plants described in 1998